Karl Zyro (or Carl Samuel Zyro) (17 July 1834 – 26 August 1896) was a Swiss politician and president of the Swiss National Council (1881/1882). He worked as an attorney and notary public in Thun.

Works

References

External links 
 
 

1834 births
1896 deaths
Members of the National Council (Switzerland)
Presidents of the National Council (Switzerland)